John Underhill may refer to:

 Sir John Underhill (died 1679), courtier to Elizabeth I of England
 John Underhill (bishop) (1545–1592), English academic and bishop of Oxford
 John Edward Underhill (1574–1608)
 John Underhill (captain) (1597–1672), English colonist and soldier
 John Q. Underhill (1848–1907), U.S. Representative from New York 
 John R. Underhill (born 1961), British professor of stratigraphy and former Scottish Premier League football referee
 John Garrett Underhill (1876–1946), author and stage producer
 John Garrett Underhill Jr. (1915–1964), U.S. Army officer